Life on Earth: A Natural History by David Attenborough is a British television natural history series made by the BBC in association with Warner Bros. Television and Reiner Moritz Productions. It was transmitted in the UK from 16 January 1979.

During the course of the series presenter David Attenborough, following the format established by Kenneth Clark's Civilisation and Jacob Bronowski's The Ascent of Man (both series which he designed and produced as director of BBC2), travels the globe in order to trace the story of the evolution of life on the planet. Like the earlier series, it was divided into 13 programmes (each of around 55 minutes' duration). The executive producer was Christopher Parsons and the music was composed by Edward Williams.

Highly acclaimed, it is the first in Attenborough's Life series of programmes and was followed by The Living Planet (1984). It established Attenborough as not only the foremost television naturalist, but also an iconic figure in British cultural life.

Filming techniques
Several special filming techniques were devised to obtain some of the footage of rare and elusive animals. One cameraman spent hundreds of hours waiting for the fleeting moment when a Darwin's frog, which incubates its young in its mouth, finally spat them out. Another built a replica of a mole rat burrow in a horizontally mounted wheel, so that as the mole rat ran along the tunnel, the wheel could be spun to keep the animal adjacent to the camera. To illustrate the motion of bats' wings in flight, a slow-motion sequence was filmed in a wind tunnel. The series was also the first to include footage of a live (although dying) coelacanth.

The cameramen took advantage of improved film stock to produce some of the sharpest and most colourful wildlife footage that had been seen to date.

The programmes also pioneered a style of presentation whereby David Attenborough would begin describing a certain species' behaviour in one location, before cutting to another to complete his illustration. Continuity was maintained, despite such sequences being filmed several months and thousands of miles apart.

Gorilla encounter
The best remembered sequence occurs in the twelfth episode, when Attenborough encounters a group of mountain gorillas in Dian Fossey's sanctuary in Rwanda. The primates had become used to humans through years of being studied by researchers. Attenborough originally intended merely to get close enough to narrate a piece about the apes' use of the opposable thumb, but as he advanced on all fours toward the area where they were feeding, he suddenly found himself face to face with an adult female. Discarding his scripted speech, he turned to camera and delivered a whispered ad lib:

When Attenborough returned to the site the next day, the female and two young gorillas began to groom and play with him. In his memoirs, Attenborough describes this as "one of the most exciting encounters of my life". He subsequently discovered, to his chagrin, that only a few seconds had been recorded: the cameraman was running low on film and wanted to save it for the planned description of the opposable thumb.

In 1999 viewers of Channel 4 voting for the 100 Greatest TV Moments placed the gorilla sequence at number 12—ranking it ahead of Queen Elizabeth II's coronation and the wedding of Charles and Diana.

Critical and commercial reception
The series was a major international success: it was sold to 100 territories and watched by an estimated audience of 500 million people worldwide. However, Life on Earth did not generate the same revenue for the BBC as later Attenborough series because the corporation signed away the American and European rights to their co-production partners, Warner Bros. and Reiner Moritz.

It was nominated for four BAFTA TV awards and won the Broadcasting Press Guild Award for Best Documentary Series. In a list of the 100 Greatest British Television Programmes drawn up by the British Film Institute in 2000, voted for by industry professionals, Life on Earth was placed 32nd.

Episodes

1997 Revision
A shortened series, using the footage and commentary from the original, was aired in 1997, edited down to three episodes: early life forms, plants, insects, and amphibians in the first; fish, birds and reptiles in the second; and mammals in the third.

DVD, Blu-ray and book
The series is available in the UK for Regions 2 and 4 as a four-disc DVD set (BBCDVD1233, released 1 September 2003) and as part of The Life Collection.
In 2012 the series was released as a four-disc Blu-ray set (released 12 November 2012).

A hardback book, Life on Earth by David Attenborough, was published in 1979 and became a worldwide bestseller. Its cover image of a Panamanian red-eyed tree frog, was taken by Attenborough himself, became an instantly recognisable emblem of the series. It is currently out of print.

A revised and updated edition of the book was published in 2018 to favourable reviews. Most if not all of the images in the 2018 edition are new, but the text remains substantially the same as the original.

Music
Edward Williams' avant-garde score matched the innovative production techniques of the television series. Williams used a traditional chamber music ensemble of (harp, flute, clarinet, strings and percussion) combined with electronic sounds. The pieces were crafted scene-by-scene to synchronise with and complement the imagery on screen: in one sequence examining the flight of birds, the instrumentation mirrors each new creature's appearance. The sounds were processed through an early British synthesiser, the EMS VCS 3, to create its evocative sound.

The score was never intended to be released commercially, but Williams had 100 copies pressed as gifts for the musicians involved. One of these LPs found its way into the hands of Jonny Trunk, owner of independent label Trunk Records, who negotiated the licence from the BBC. The soundtrack was finally released on 2 November 2009.

References

External links
 
 
 Life on Earth on the Eden website
 British Film Institute Screen Online
 The Reunion BBC Radio 4 programme about the making of Life on Earth

1970s British documentary television series
1979 British television series debuts
1979 British television series endings
BBC television documentaries
Evolutionary biology
Nature educational television series
Documentary television shows about evolution
Television series by BBC Studios
Television series by Warner Bros. Television Studios